George Richard Millard (October 2, 1914 – June 15, 2018) was a suffragan bishop of the Episcopal Diocese of California from 1960 to 1978.

Early life
George Richard Millard was born on October 2, 1914 in Dunsmuir, California to George Ellis and Constance (Rainsberry) Millard. He attended high school in Sacramento, California, and later graduated with a Bachelor of Arts from the University of California, Berkeley in 1936, and then in 1938 a Bachelor of Divinity from the Episcopal Theological School in Cambridge, Massachusetts. He was awarded an honorary Doctor of Divinity from the Church Divinity School of the Pacific in 1960 and a Master of Arts from the Santa Clara University in 1983.

Ordained Ministry 
Millard was ordained deacon in July 1938 by Bishop Archie W. N. Porter of Northern California and priest in June 1939 by Bishop Henry Knox Sherrill of Massachusetts. He initially served as curate at St James' Church in New York City from 1938 to 1939 until he became curate of St John's Church in Waterbury, Connecticut. In 1941 he became curate at St James' Church in Danbury, Connecticut, while in 1943 h became the rector f the same church. He as also rector of Christ Church in Alameda, California between 1951 and 1960.

Episcopacy 
Millard was elected Suffragan Bishop of California in 1959. He was then consecrated bishop on February 2, 1960 in Grace Cathedral by Presiding Bishop Arthur C. Lichtenberger. He remained in office until his retirement in 1978. He was then appointed as Suffragan Bishop for the Convocation of Episcopal Churches in Europe, where he served until 1980. He then worked at the Episcopal Church Center in New York, after which he attended Saint Mary's College of California where he completed a degree in psychology. He then went on to work as a Veterans Hospital Chaplain till 2005.

Personal life
He married Mary Louise Gessling on June 29, 1939. They had three children George, Martha and Joseph. His son George died in 2002 and his wife Mary died at the age of 90 on August 15, 2005. He turned 100 in October 2014. He died on June 15, 2018 at the age of 103.

References

External links 
celebrating the most senior bishop in the episcopal church

1914 births
2018 deaths
American centenarians
Men centenarians
People from Dunsmuir, California
University of California alumni
20th-century American Episcopalians
Episcopal bishops of California